Bellona (minor planet designation: 28 Bellona) is a large main-belt asteroid. It was discovered by German astronomer R. Luther on March 1, 1854, and named after Bellōna, the Roman goddess of war; the name was chosen to mark the beginning of the Crimean War. It is a stony (S-type) asteroid with a cross-section size of around 100–120 km. 28 Bellona is orbiting the Sun with a period of 4.63 years.

Bellona has been studied by radar. Photometric observations of this asteroid at the Palmer Divide Observatory in Colorado Springs, Colorado in 2007 gave a light curve with a period of 15.707 ± 0.002 hours and a brightness variation of 0.27 ± 0.03 in magnitude. This report is in close agreement with a period estimate of 15.695 hours reported in 1983, and rejects a longer period of 16.523 hours reported in 1979.

References

External links
 Lightcurve plot of 28 Bellona, Palmer Divide Observatory, B. D. Warner (2007)
 Asteroid Lightcurve Database (LCDB), query form (info )
 Dictionary of Minor Planet Names, Google books
 Asteroids and comets rotation curves, CdR – Observatoire de Genève, Raoul Behrend
 Discovery Circumstances: Numbered Minor Planets (1)-(5000) – Minor Planet Center
 
 

000028
000028
000028
Discoveries by Robert Luther
Named minor planets
18540301